Gaya Lal was an Indian politician and member of the Indian National Congress. Lal was a member of the Haryana Legislative Assembly from the Hodal constituency in Palwal district.

Gaya Lal in 1967 changed party thrice in a fortnight first from the Indian National Congress to Janata Party, back to Congress and then within nine hours to Janata Party again. When Gaya Lal decided to quit the United Front and join the Congress, then Congress leader Rao Birendra Singh brought him to Chandigarh press and declared "Aaya Ram Gaya Ram". It became the subject of numerous jokes and cartoons. In 1985 the Constitution was amended to prevent such defections. Lal's son Udai Bhan is presently State President of Haryana unit of Indian National Congress.

References 

People from Palwal district
Indian National Congress politicians
Janata Party politicians
Members of the Haryana Legislative Assembly
Year of birth missing
2009 deaths